This list article contains data about Dutch buildings of at least  high – essentially all modern, fairly recent buildings/towers, but also including two old church towers over 100m, the tallest of which (the Dom Tower of Utrecht) was completed in 1382.

The top-ten tallest buildings in the Netherlands all stand in the three biggest cities of the country (Amsterdam, Rotterdam, and The Hague), with Rotterdam holding the top six tallest buildings in 2022.

After much of Rotterdam was bombed and destroyed in the German invasion of the Netherlands in 1940, the people of Rotterdam chose to rebuild their city with modernistic architecture, instead of rebuilding in a more traditional style. In 1991, the Delftse Poort office towers, right by Rotterdam Central railway station,  became the first Dutch skyscraper complex to breach , and practically ended the debate whether the country had any true skyscrapers at all.

The generally infirm nature of Dutch soil types, with bedrock typically only found at considerable depth, generally makes the foundation engineering of very tall buildings quite challenging, and Delftse Poort remained the country's tallest tower until May 2009. Nevertheless, since it was built, it inspired new towers between 100m and 150m tall to be created in many Dutch cities and towns. In 2022, Rotterdam raised the bar once again by opening the  taller Zalmhaven tower.

Buildings
The listed heights exclude flagpoles, antennae and other such elements. Only finished buildings are listed.

Tallest buildings under construction/approved/in study

Under construction 

 Post Rotterdam: Rotterdam, 155 m
 CoolTower: Rotterdam, 154 m
 Grotius Towers: The Hague, 120 m + 100 m
 Y-Towers: Amsterdam, 114 m + 106 m
 CasaNova: Rotterdam, 110 m
 Boompjes 60-68: Rotterdam, 110 m
 Toren Niko: Eindhoven, 109 m
 SPOT: Amsterdam, 108 m
 Wonderwoods: Utrecht, 105 m
 Bunkertoren: Eindhoven, 103 m
 Valley: Amsterdam, 100 m

Approved 
 The Grace: The Hague, 180 m + 150 m
 District E: Eindhoven, 170 m + 117 m + 90 m
 The Sax: Rotterdam, 170 m
 Baan Tower: Rotterdam, 157 m
 Dreef Residential Tower: Amsterdam, 133 m
 VDMA-Terrein I: Eindhoven, 105 m
 Eurostaete: Eindhoven, 100 m
 Vierlander Locatie: Eindhoven, 100 m

Study 
 RISE: Rotterdam, 280 m + 150 m + 100 m
 Rijnhaven: Rotterdam, 250 m + 200 m + 200 m + 200 m + 120 m + 120 m
 De Laak: The Hague, 245 m + 185 m
 Fellenoord: Eindhoven, 235 m
 Codrico: Rotterdam, 220 m
 Lumieretoren: Rotterdam, 200 m
 Kruiskade Weena: Rotterdam, 200 m + 150 m
 Schiekadeblok: Rotterdam, 200 m
 Hart010: Rotterdam, 180 m
 Bellevue: The Hague, 160 m + 160 m
 HS Kwartier: The Hague, 160 m + 160 m + 140 m + 140 m + 135 m
Stadhuisplein: Eindhoven, 160 m + 140 m + 130 
 De Caap: Capelle aan den IJssel, 150m 
 B-Proud: The Hague, 140 m + 140 m
 Nieuw Pompenburg: Rotterdam, 140 m + 115 m
 MARK: Utrecht, 140 m + 110 m
 Urban Interactive District: Amsterdam, 140 m
 Clarissenhof 2: Tilburg, 133m 
Tree House: Rotterdam, 130 m 
 Dutch Mountains: Eindhoven, 130 m + 102 m
Porter House: Rotterdam, 128 m 
 WTC Toren: Eindhoven, 120 m
Anna: The Hague, 125 m + 100 m
 De Modernist: Rotterdam, 125 m
Binck Blocks: The Hague, 122 m
 Karsp 14+16: Amsterdam, 120 m
Lead: Leiden, 115 m
 Antonio Vivaldistraat: Amsterdam, 115 m
The One: Rotterdam, 110 m
 Marten Meesweg: Rotterdam, 110 m
 SPOT Amsterdam: Amsterdam, 108m

See also
 List of tallest buildings in Amsterdam
 List of tallest buildings in Rotterdam
 List of tallest buildings in Haaglanden
 List of tallest structures in the Netherlands
 List of tallest buildings in the European Union
 List of tallest buildings in Europe
 List of tallest buildings in the world

Main source